there is little wind power in Belarus but a lot of potential. Together with solar power, wind power is the most important sector of renewable energy in Belarus.  there is one 106MW windfarm. New wind power is hindered by government quotas and the lack of auctions.

Wind resources 
The country has already identified 1640 points where it is possible to install wind power plants, although the wind speed over the territory of Belarus is on average no more than 3.5–5 m/s, and for the economic benefit of wind turbines it should reach 7–12 m/s. The best conditions for wind power are observed on the hills near Navahrudak, Minsk, and Orsha.

Main enterprises 

Until the year 2010, individual units already operated in the Minsk and Grodno regions. By 2017, the largest of the wind energy facilities is Navahrudak wind park, which belongs to the RUE branch «Grodnoenergo» Lida energy networks. The first wind generator appeared here near the village Hrabnyky in 2011. The windbreak showed good results. In 2016, close to installed 5 similar installations of the Chinese company «HEAG».
Creation of a wind park cost the state 13 million dollars. Annual electricity generation is about 22 million kWh. Such amount of generated energy allows to save 4.5 million cubic meters of gas per year (700 000-800 000 dollars). The station is serviced by 10 certified employees of "Grodnoenergo".

In 2017, there were about 47 facilities in the country where wind turbines are operated with a total installed capacity of 84 MW. By 2020, the commissioning of wind power stations is expected in Smorgon (15 MW), Oshmyany (25 MW), Liozno (50 MW) and Dzerzhinsky (160 MW) regions.

According to forecasts, by 2020, the power capacity of wind turbines will be 289 MW. By 2030 - about 500 MW.

References

Sources 

 Wind Energy Potential in Belarus
 The tailwind: How Belarus is developing wind energy
 New report: Wind-power market in Belarus 2016 to 2025